Kozarice  is a village located in Croatia. 

Populated places in Sisak-Moslavina County